Nuse Island is one of the 17,508 islands that comprise the Republic of Indonesia. The island is located in Ndao Nuse District, Rote Ndao Regency, East Nusa Tenggara. Geographically, Nuse Island is in the southwest of Rote Island.

References

Islands of Indonesia
East Nusa Tenggara